The Camilla Commercial Historic District in Camilla, Georgia is a  historic district that was listed on the National Register of Historic Places in 1985.  It then included 23 contributing buildings.  The majority of structures are one- to three-story brick commercial buildings, that are "modest examples of the Victorian Eclectic, Early 20th-century Commercial, and Art Deco styles and represent local builder/architects' interpretations of nationally popular styles."  The commercial buildings are contrasted by the white marble Mitchell County Courthouse, which was designed by Atlanta architect William J.J. Chase (1884–1967) and built in the mid-1930s.

References

Historic districts on the National Register of Historic Places in Georgia (U.S. state)
Victorian architecture in Georgia (U.S. state)
Art Deco architecture in Georgia (U.S. state)
National Register of Historic Places in Mitchell County, Georgia